= Nilavane =

Village in Maharashtra

- Village
- Interactive map of Nilavane
- Country: India
- State: Maharashtra

Nilavane is a small village in Ratnagiri district, Maharashtra state, in Western India. The 2011 Census of India recorded a total of 448 residents in the village. Nilavane's geographical area is approximately 416 hectares (1,030 acres).
